Davide Arras (born 2 April 1998) ,nicknamed "Il Mago"is an Italian professional footballer who plays as a forward for  club Gubbio on loan from Siena.

Club career
Born in Olbia, Arras started his career in Vicenza, then Juventus and Cagliari youth sectors.

In 2017 he joined to Olbia. Arras made his professional debut for Serie C on 3 September 2017 against Follonica Gavorrano.

In 2018, he was loaned to Reggina, but don't played for the club.

In August 2018, he left Olbia and signed with Cuneo

For the next season, in August 2019 he joined to Foligno.

After one year in Foligno, he signed for Serie D club Pianese.

On 14 July 2021, he signed with Grosseto.

On 3 August 2022, Arras moved to Siena on a multi-year contract. On 31 January 2023, Arras was loaned to Gubbio, with an option to buy.

International career
Arras played two matches for Italy U15 in 2013.

References

External links
 
 

1998 births
Living people
People from Olbia
Footballers from Sardinia
Italian footballers
Italy youth international footballers
Association football forwards
Serie C players
Serie D players
Olbia Calcio 1905 players
Reggina 1914 players
A.C. Cuneo 1905 players
A.S.D. Città di Foligno 1928 players
U.S. Pianese players
U.S. Grosseto 1912 players
A.C.N. Siena 1904 players
A.S. Gubbio 1910 players